Canyon Creek is a small community of less than 200 citizens in Lewis and Clark County, Montana, United States. The community has an Antique and General Store with a U.S. Post Office, Volunteer Fire Station, Elementary School and a RV Park; it has a zip code of 59633.

The community's name comes from a nearby tributary of the Missouri River, which flows through a canyon.

Demographics

References

Unincorporated communities in Lewis and Clark County, Montana
Unincorporated communities in Montana